Eastern HVDC and Eastern HVDC projects are the names used by Ofgem for two planned HVDC submarine power cables from the East coast of Scotland to Northeast England to strengthen the National Grid. The two links combined will deliver 4GW of renewable energy from Scottish wind farms to England.

Ofgem state that "At an estimated cost of £3.4billion for the two links, the Eastern HVDC projects would be the largest electricity transmission investment project in the recent history of Great Britain."

Eastern HVDC projects

In July 2022, Ofgem published its conditional decision on the Final needs case for the Eastern HVDC project, confirming its choice of two separate HVDC links, each rated at 2GW.
 Scotland-England Green Link 1 (SEGL1) will run from Torness in Southeast Scotland to Hawthorn Pit substation in county Durham
 Eastern Green Link 2 (EGL2) is will run from Peterhead, near Aberdeen, to Drax in Yorkshire

Ofgem approved the schemes as part of its Accelerated Strategic Transmission Investment Framework.

Scotland-England Green Link 1 (SEGL1)

Current status
In December 2022, the connection received approval from the UK energy regulator Ofgem.

As of July 2021, construction was expected to start in 2023, with the construction phase complete in 2027.

Route
SEGL1 will run from Torness in Southeast Scotland to Hawthorn Pit substation in Northeast England. Landfall in England will be to the North of Seaham, on the Durham Coast.

Technical specification
The cable will carry 2GW.
The DC voltage will be +/-525kV, using voltage source converter (VSC) technology, carried on cross-linked polyethylene (XLPE) cables, with a fall back option of mass impregnated (MI) cables.

Economic case
The investment required is £1.294billion.

Project partners
SEGL1 is being developed by Scottish Power Transmission plc (SPT) and National Grid Electricity Transmission plc (National Grid).

Eastern Green Link 2 (EGL2)

Current status
In December 2022, the connection received approval from the UK energy regulator Ofgem.

As of December 2022, the project was in the "early development" stage. Early enabing works are expected in 2024, with the main construction phase starting in 2025. Target date for energisation is 2029.

Route
The cable will run from Sandford Bay, at Peterhead in Scotland, to the Drax Power Station in Yorkshire, England. The northern converter station will be next to the existing power station at Peterhead.

Technical specification
The cable will carry 2GW.
The DC voltage will be +/-525kV, using Voltage Source converter (VSC) technology, carried on Cross-linked polyethylene (XLPE) cables, with a fall back option of mass impregnated (MI) cables.

Economic case
The investment required is £2.1billion. It is needed to reinforce the National Grid, to "alleviate existing and future constraints on the electricity transmission network", and support new renewable electricity generation.

Project partners
EGL2 is a joint venture between SSEN Transmission and National Grid Electricity Transmission (NGET).

See also
Western HVDC Link

References

External links
 SEGL1 project website at Scottish Power Energy Networks (where it is known as the "Eastern Link Project")
 EGL2 project website at SSEN, where it is known as "Eastern Green Link 2"
 EGL2 project website at National Grid, where it is known as "Scotland to England Green Link SEGL2"

Electrical interconnectors to and from Great Britain
Submarine power cables